The Eastern Association of Rowing Colleges (EARC) is a college athletic conference of eighteen men's college rowing crews. It is an affiliate of the Eastern College Athletic Conference (ECAC).

Members
Eighteen colleges and universities are members of the EARC, mostly in the North-East and Mid-Atlantic United States, but also in the Mid-West with the University of Wisconsin–Madison. All eight Ivy League universities are members of the EARC.

Boston University
Brown University
Columbia University
Cornell University
Dartmouth College
George Washington University
Georgetown University
Harvard University
College of the Holy Cross

Massachusetts Institute of Technology
Northeastern University
University of Pennsylvania
Princeton University
Rutgers University
Syracuse University
United States Naval Academy
University of Wisconsin–Madison
Yale University

Championship

See also
Eastern Association of Women's Rowing Colleges

Footnotes

External links
 (EARC) home page (Eastern College Athletic Conference official website).

 
NCAA Division I conferences